The National Cadet Corps (NCC) is the youth wing of the Indian Armed Forces with its headquarters in New Delhi, India. It is open to school and college students on voluntary basis as a Tri-Services Organisation, comprising the Army, the Navy and the Air Force, engaged in developing the youth of the country into disciplined and patriotic citizens. The soldier youth foundation in India is a voluntary organization which recruits cadets from high schools, higher secondary, colleges and universities all over India. The cadets are given basic military training in small arms and drill. The officers and cadets have no liability for active military service once they complete their course.

The emblem of the NCC consists of 3 colours; red, dark blue and light blue. These colours represent the Indian Army, Indian Navy and Indian Air Force respectively. The 17 lotuses indicate the 17 directorates

History 

The NCC in India was formed in 1948. It can be traced back to the ‘University Corps’, which was created under the Indian Defence Act 1917, with the objective to make up for a shortage of personnel in the Army. In 1920, when the Indian Territorial Act was passed, the ‘University Corps’ was replaced by the University Training Corps (UTC). The aim was to raise the status of the UTC and make it more attractive to the youth. UTC Officers and cadets wear Army uniform. It was a significant step towards the 'Indianisation' of the Indian armed forces. It was renamed the UOTC so the National Cadet Corps can be considered a successor to the University Officers Training Corps (UOTC) which was established by the Government of India in 1942. During World War II, the UOTC never came up to the expectations set by the British. This led to the idea that some better schemes should be formed, which could train more young men in a better way, even during peace. A committee headed by H. N. Kunzru recommended a cadet organization to be established in schools and universities at a national level. The soldier youth foundation Act was accepted by the Governor General, and on the 15th of July 1950 the soldier youth foundation came into existence.

In 1949, the Girls Division was formed in order to provide equal opportunities to school and college-going girls. The NCC was given an inter-service image in 1950 when the Air Wing was added, followed by the Naval Wing in 1952. In the same year, the NCC curriculum was extended to include community development/social service activities as a part of the NCC syllabus at the behest of Late Pandit Jawaharlal Nehru who took a keen interest in the growth of the NCC. Following the 1962 Sino-Indian War, to meet the requirement of the Nation, NCC training was made compulsory in 1963. This was discontinued in 1968, when the Corps was again made voluntary.

During Indo-Pakistani war of 1965 & Bangladesh-Pakistani war of 1971, NCC cadets were the second line of defence. They organized camps to assist ordnance factories, supplying arms and ammunition to the front and also were used as patrol parties to capture enemy paratroopers. The NCC cadets also worked hand in hand with the Civil defense authorities and actively took part in rescue works and traffic control.

After the 1965 and 1971 wars, the NCC syllabus was revised. Rather than just being a second line of defence, the revised NCC syllabus laid greater stress on developing qualities of leadership and officer like qualities. The military training which the NCC cadets received was reduced and greater importance was given to social service and youth management.

Motto and aim 
"The discussion for the motto of NCC was started in 11th central advisory meeting (CAC) held on 11 August 1978. At that time there were many mottos in mind like "Duty and wisdom"; "Duty, Unity and Discipline"; "Duty and Unity"; "Unity and Discipline". Later, at the 12th CAC meeting on 12 Oct 1980 they selected and declared "Unity and Discipline" as the motto for the NCC. In living up to its motto, the NCC strives to be and is one of the greatest cohesive forces of the nation, bringing together the youth hailing from different parts of the country and molding them into united and disciplined citizens of the nation".

Organisation 
The NCC is headed by the Director General (DG), an officer of three-star rank. The DG is assisted by two Additional Director Generals (A and B) of two-star rank (major-general, rear-admiral or air vice-marshal). Five Brigadier level officers and other civil officials also assist him.

The Headquarters is located in Delhi. The organisational structure continues as follows:

 Directorate – There are 17 Directorates located in the state capitals headed by an officer of the rank of a Maj Gen from the three Services. 
 Division / Regimental Corps – There are 3 such Specialised Corps located in Mumbai, Delhi and Bangalore respectively. They are independent of the state directorate and report to the HQ. These divisions form the support function of the regular NCC. Each is headed by a Senior Officer- an equivalent rank of (Lt.) General. Internal Affairs, Administration, Development and Research: Lt. Gen. [SUO] Arvind Shekhar (New Delhi). Recruitment, Training, Media and HR: Lt. Gen. [SUO] Prithvi Pant Negi (Mumbai). Special Forces, Infantry, Gallantry Committee & Commendations: Lt. Gen. [SUO] Bhav Salimath (Bangalore).
 Group – Depending upon the size of the state and growth of NCC in the states, Directorates have up to 14 Group Headquarters under them through which they exercise their command and control of the organisation in the state. Each group is headed by an officer of the rank of Brigadier or equivalent known as Group Commander. 
 Battalion- Each NCC Group Headquarters control 5–7 units (Bns) commanded by Colonel/Lt.Col or equivalent.
 Company – Each Battalion consists of companies which are commanded by the Associate NCC Officer (ANO) of the rank of lieutenant to major.

In all there are 96 Group Headquarters in the country who exercise control over a network of 700 Army wing units (including technical and girls unit), 73 Naval wing units and 64 Air Squadrons. There are two training establishments namely Officers Training School, Kamptee (Nagpur, Maharashtra) and Women Officers Training School, Gwalior. Besides this Vice Chancellor's of various universities across India are conferred with honorary rank of commandant in NCC, to promote and support NCC in their respective University.

Units

These 17 directorates are divided in total of 837 units divided in three service groups Army, Naval and Air. Out of those 700 are Army, 73 Naval and 64 Air units.

Types of Army NCC units and their numbers are given below :

Arms 
 HQ:    HQ NCC, DTE, Group HQ, BN & COYHQ
 Army:  Technical (Engineers, Signals, Medical, EME, CTR),:Non Technical (Infantry, Armoured & ARTY)
 Air:   Flying & Technical
 Navy:  Unit, Naval Tech., Medical, DAS
 TRG:   OTA - Gwalior & OTA - Kamptee

Strength 
 Army: Each battalion or unit of NCC consists of a number of platoons or coy. For senior division boys each platoon consists of 52 cadets and each coy consists 160 cadets. Each BN has 4 to 7 coys so each BN carries around 640 to 1120 cadets. A senior wing girls BN consists of 2 to 7 coy means a total of 320 to 1120 cadets. For junior division boys and junior wing girls each troop has 100 cadets and each BN has at least one troop.
 Navy: For senior division boys each BN or unit consists of 4 to 8 divisions and each division consists of 50 cadets. For senior wing girls similar arrangement exists as of senior division boys. For junior division boys and junior wing girls each BN has a troop of 100 cadets.
Air: For senior division boys and senior wing girls each unit consists of at least 2 fleets each consists of 100 cadets. So each unit known as Squadron carries around 200 cadets. For junior wing girls and junior division boys each squadron has a troop consisted of 100 cadets.

However, each unit can have up to 24 troops of senior division boys expanding their strength to 2400 cadets but this is maximum limit.

Personnel

Cadet Ranks 

JD boys and JW girls are given ranks up to Company Sergeant Major (CSM) in the Army Wing. Only SD boys and SW girls are given ranks above CSM in the Army Wing.
In the Air Force and Navy Wings JD boys and JW girls are given ranks up to Cadet Warrant Officer/Petty Officer Cadet only and SD boys and SW girls are given ranks above Cadet Warrant Officer/Petty Officer Cadet.

Regular Officers 
The NCC directorates are headed by service officers of the rank of major general and equivalent; group headquarters are headed by service officers of the rank of brigadiers and equivalent, and units are headed by service officers of the rank of colonel (TS)/lieutenant colonel/major or equivalent. They are responsible for proper training, planning and execution of NCC activities.

Whole Time Lady Officers 
A cadre of whole time lady officers (WTLO) with cadre strength 110 officers has been sanctioned in 1995. They are to be commissioned partly through departmental channel and partly through UPSC in a phased manner.

Associate NCC Officer 
ANO is an important link in the NCC organization between the battalion and the cadets. As a matter of fact, ANO is the feeder node of NCC since they are the one who is in direct contact with the cadets all throughout the year. There are two training establishments namely Officers Training Academy, Kamptee and Officers Training Academy, Gwalior. These two institutions train the school and college teachers selected to head the company/troop. Courses in these institutions range from 21 days to 90 days in duration.

"ANOs are commissioned in NCC and not in regular Armed forces".

Associate NCC officers are given the following ranks according to their seniority and their training.

 For colleges (in charge of SD & SW): (NCC Army Wing)
 Major
 Captain
 Lieutenant

 For schools (in charge of JD & JW, equivalent commissioned officer):
 Chief Officer
 1st Officer
 2nd Officer
 3rd Officer

Uniform 
Army NCC cadets wear khaki uniforms, Naval NCC cadets wear the white uniform and  Air Force NCC cadets wear grey uniforms. The uniform is compulsory at all meetings and training of the NCC.

Cadets from SD boys Army wing wear khaki full sleeve shirts and trousers. Cadets from JD wear a khaki shirt and khaki shorts. Girl cadets from SW and JW both wear khaki full sleeve shirts and trousers. Cadets from SD boys Naval wing wear white half sleeve shirts and white trousers and JD boys wear half sleeve white shirts and white shorts. Girls from Naval wing SW and JW wear white half sleeve shirts and trousers. Cadets from SD boys Air wing wear light blue half sleeve shirts and trousers & JD cadets wear light blue half sleeve shirts and trousers. Girls from SW and JW wear light blue half sleeve shirts and trousers.

In addition to these uniforms, SW and JW cadets wear white Shalwar kameezes during activities other than when on parade. A rifle green beret is compulsory for all cadets, except Sikh cadets who wear a rifle green turban. For physical training, cadets wear brown canvas shoes, and for drill, they wear black leather shoes called D.M.S (Drill March Shoes). Woolen sweaters are compulsory in cold areas. The colour of these sweaters vary: they are khaki for the army, navy blue for the navy, and black for the air force.

Training 

Total training period for SD and SW is 3 years with an extension of 1 year permissible & training period for JD & JW is of 2 years. Every cadet of the Senior or Junior Division has to undergo service training for a period of at least 4 hours per week during the training year. However, no training is carried out during periods when the college or school through which a cadet is enrolled is closed for a vacation. Every cadet of the Senior and Junior Division has undergo service training for a minimum period of 75% of total hours during the annual college and school session. Every cadet (in case of JD, who has completed one full year of training and is in his second year) attends an annual training camp of 9–10 days, also known as National Combined Annual Training Camp. For SD/SW the duration is usually for up to 30 days. At the end of the camp training the cadets receive a certificate of successful completion.

Certificates & Examination 
There are Three Certificates in NCC. Below describes about it from lower value to higher value:-
 Certificate – A : It can be taken by JD/JW cadets of the NCC, during class year 8 and 9. After passing those classes it can't be obtained. The candidate must have attended a minimum 75% of total training periods laid down in the syllabus for the first and second years of JD/JW NCC (All Wings). The candidate must have attended one Annual Training Camp.
 Certificate – B : It can be taken by SD/SW cadets of the NCC, after class year 10 and those studying for a degree. The candidate must have attended a minimum 75% of total training periods laid down in the syllabus for the first and second years of SD/SW NCC (All Wings). The cadet must have attended one Annual Training Camp/NIC. Cadets who possess Certificate - A will be awarded 10 bonus marks. An air wing cadet must do a minimum 10 Glider launches.
 Certificate – C : Is the highest level certificate for NCC cadets. It can be taken in the third year of training, in the third year of degree course. Those who possess a Certificate - B can take it in the first year after their +2, and in the first year of their degree. The cadet must have attended two Annual Training Camps or one Annual Training Camp and one of the following: RD Camp Delhi, Centrally Organised Camp, Para Training Camp, Attachment Training with service units, National Integration Camp, Youth Exchange Programme, or Foreign Cruise (Navy Wing only).

Grading in Certificate 
Three certificates are awarded: 'A' grade, 'B' grade, 'C' grade.

The best grade is A, which has the highest value.
A cadet has to obtain 45% marks in each paper & 50% marks in the aggregate to pass the examination. Grading is based on total marks obtain will be awarded as follows.
Grading 'A' – Cadets obtaining 80% marks and above,
Grading 'B' – Cadets obtaining 65% marks and above but below 80%,
Grading 'C' – Cadets obtaining 50% marks and above but below 65%,
Fail – Cadets obtaining less than 45% in any paper or less than 50% in aggregate.

Activities

Republic Day Camp (RDC) 

Before the RDC, all group headquarters participate in the IGC (Inter-Group Competition)
After the IGC, the selected cadets are trained by the drill instructors of the Indian Army and they are given rigorous military training and drill training daily until the time comes when the cadets have to depart to Delhi to represent their respective states.
 NCC Republic Day Camp is the culmination of all NCC Training activities. RDC is held at Cariappa Parade Ground, Delhi Cantt from 01 to 29 Jan. 1850 Selected NCC Cadets from 17 directorates attend the Camp. Every directorate has 5 to 7 units under them. The Camp is inaugurated by the Vice President of India and culminates with Prime Minister's Rally on 28 Jan.
 During the camp visit of Raksha Mantri, Cabinet Ministers, Chief Minister of Delhi, three Service Chiefs and various State Ministers/VIPs are also organised.
 During the RDC, various competitions are conducted amongst the 17 NCC Directorates to decide the Champion Directorate for award of Prime Minister's Banner. Competitions are keenly contested in various events such as National Integration Awareness presentation, Drill, Line & Flag Area, Cultural Programs i.e. (group song, group dance & ballet), Best Cadet of Senior Division (Boys) and Senior Wing (Girls) in each Service – Army, Navy & Air Discipline and Best Cadet Boys and Girls each from Junior Wing. Aero modelling and Ship modelling are also conducted during RDC.

The National Cadet Corps maintains two cadet bands: the Boys Band of the NCC and the Girls Band of the NCC. They are commonly formed up during the NCC Republic Day Camp in late January, during which the bands participate in the Republic Day Parade on 26 January and the Prime Minister's Rally on 28 January.

Combined Annual Training Camps (CATC) 
In the CATCs, the boys (senior and junior divisions) and girl cadets (senior and junior wings) of a particular NCC unit participate in the 10-day camp. Classes are conducted as per the given syllabus wherein certain aspects of NCC training are taught once again. The camp acts as a refresher training for the cadets and they are also trained in basic skills of survival and emergencies besides other topics. They are taught certain skills pertaining specifically to their Wing for e.g., a Naval cadet is trained in boat-rowing, oaring, Semaphore, etc. Another activity in the camp is the "dogwatch" wherein two cadets are to stay on sentry duty for two hours at any time given time of the day. Those caught sleeping, especially during late night or early morning shifts, or otherwise missing from duty are severely reprimanded or penalized. Cadets are also introduced to weapons such as a .22 caliber rifle. They are also given tasks of serving food to fellow cadets.

National Integration Camp (NIC) 
NIC is to propagate national integration among cadets and society.'Only the best cadets in drills and march are sent to represent their states.'This camp is considered for SSLC and higher secondary course (+2) grace marks
These camps are conducted on All India basis and help bridge the cultural gap among various States of India. In addition, there are six special NICs conducted at Leh, Nagrota (J&K), Chakabama (NER, Nagaland), Srinagar, Lakshadweep and Port Blair.

Advance Leadership Camp (ALC) 
Advance Leadership Camp is conducted 6 times in various places throughout India. A cadet must have completed Basic Leadership Camp in order to qualify for this camp. In this camp the officers give cadets training for SSB screening and entrance.

Army Attachment Camp 
These camps are conducted by the NCC in collaboration with Indian Army, as the willing cadets are attached to the specific regiments undergoing the training period of 10–15 days. In this camp, the cadets are trained by the instructors of the particular regiment, in the military tactics including day/night warfare & also get familiar with the weaponry.

Hiking And Trekking Camps 
Adventurous treks and hikes up mountains take place, with expeditions to local mountains and hills.

Thal Sainik Camp (TSC) 
The TSC is a 12-day camp conducted in Delhi every year in the late autumn, in which the cadets are selected from all 17 directorates (30+3 SD / JD and SW / JW cadets from each directorate), by the selection procedure conducting 3 pre-TSC camps each of 10–12 days in a week interval. The selected cadets then are sent to the TSC to represent their respective directorates in the following competitions:
 Obstacle course – In which the obstacles include 6-feet wall, zig-zag, double ditch, balancing, 3-feet bar, left bar, right bar, incline, etc. It is done after wearing full tactical gear with rifles.
 Firing – It consists of two types – Shooting (Grouping, Snap-shooting & Application). It is done with a standard .22 caliber rifle at the range of 25 meters & 50 meters.
 Map Reading – which includes working with a compass, service protractor & a map.
 Field craft and battle craft.
 Tent pitching.

Vayu Sainik Camp (VSC) 
The All India Vayu Sainik Camp is the most prestigious and glorious camp of the NCC air wing. This time AIVSC was held at Air Force Station at Jodhpur in Rajasthan. In-fact, representing at NATIONAL level itself gives you enough power & confidence. The AIVSC is the apex training camp of NCC and is designed to expose the cadets to a strenuous military way of life, in addition to rousing their competitive spirits by pitting them against their peers in a number of aviation-related disciplines such as Microlight Flying, Aero Modelling, Skeet Shooting, .22 Rifle Firing, Drill and written tests of various subjects related to flying. Basically this camp is the culmination of various NCC training activities conducted amongst 16 directorates to decide the champion directorate.

On the very first day all the cadets were briefed by the camp commandant regarding camp. Each day there was an activity either it was any competition or any other.

Apart from these events one day was decided to give A visit to Air Force Station, Jodhpur where cadets see and learn how various fighter planes and helicopters works, Luckily cadets also got opportunity to fly in an Indian Air Force Mi-17 helicopter and Pipistrel microlight aircraft and also got chance to visit glorious places of interest in and around Jodhpur.

The camp, in fact, portrays a reflection of 'mini India'. The camp is visited by a number of dignitaries, including DDG and many other army and air force officials.

Nau Sainik Camp (NSC) 
This centrally organised Naval Camp is conducted annually for selected Naval Wing Cadets. Boat pulling, semaphore, whaler rigging, drill competitions are the main attraction of the camp. It is generally held at Naval Maritime Academy (NAMAC) at Visakhapatnam but started to be held at Karwar from 2014. Cdt Lakhvir Bawa was adjudged and won gold medal as Best cadet in 1995 from Kerala and Lakshadweep directorate.

All India Yachting Regetta (AIYR) 
This centrally organised Naval Camp is conducted annually for selected Naval Wing Cadets. Yachting (Sailing) is the main attraction of the camp. It is generally held at Naval Base INS Chilika at Odisha.

Rock Climbing Camps (RCC) 
Eight rock climbing camps are held each year to expose the cadets to the basics of elementary rock climbing and to inculcate spirit of adventure amongst cadets. Four of these camps are held at Gwalior in Madhya Pradesh and other four camps at Nayyardam near Trivandrum in Kerala.

Naval Wing Activities 
Naval wing syllabus is common for both boys and girls. During sea training naval subjects like Seamanship, Navigation, Communication, Gunnery, Damage Control and Ship Safety are taught to cadets. Swimming, Scuba Diving and Wind Surfing are the other interesting activities.

Air Wing Activities 
Gliding, Microlite Flying (generally the Zenith STOL CH 701) and attachment training with air force stations and establishments are the main activities. 100 Pipistrel Virus SW 80 on order.

Youth Exchange Programme 
The aim of YEP is a country-to-country exchange of cadets belonging to NCC or other equivalent government or youth organizations of friendly countries and participation in various activities and appreciation of each other's socio-economic and cultural realities. More than 150 cadets proceed abroad on YEP annually.

Overseas Deployment 
A select few cadets from the Senior Division (Navy) are attached to the 1st Training Squadron of the Indian Navy, for a period of 30–45 days, wherein they are trained in Naval Subjects and Practical Seamanship as well as travel to friendly foreign nations on Goodwill Missions. A total of 10-20 cadets are selected to represent the National Cadet Corps, for this camp.

List of Directors-general of the NCC
The Director-Generals of the NCC held the rank of major-general from 1951 until 1983, when the appointment was upgraded to the rank of Lieutenant General.

See also 
 National Service Scheme (NSS)
 Rashtriya Indian Military College (RIMC)
 Rashtriya Military Schools (RMS)
 Sainik Schools
 Foreign Cadet Organisations
 Australian Defence Force Cadets
 Bangladesh National Cadet Corps
 Canadian Cadet Organizations
 United Kingdom
 Combined Cadet Force (in schools)
 University Service Units (in Universities)
 United States
 Junior Reserve Officers' Training Corps (in schools)
 Reserve Officers' Training Corps (in Universities)
 National Cadet Corps (Ghana)
 National Cadet Corps (Singapore)
 National Cadet Corps (Sri Lanka)
 New Zealand Cadet Forces

References

External links 

 

Youth organisations based in India
Military of India
Military education and training in India
Military youth groups
1948 establishments in India